USS Retaliation may refer to the following ships of the United States Navy:

, was a brigantine which operated in the Continental Navy
, was a French privateer captured by the United States during the Quasi-War

United States Navy ship names